Feliks (Felicjan) Franciszek Łoyko-Rędziejowski (1717 – 19 May 1779) was a Polish nobleman, diplomat, political writer, lawyer and economist as well as a confidant of Stanislaus Augustus, supporter of the Polish Enlightenment and from 1766 onwards Poland's ambassador to the Kingdom of France. He was also known as Eleuthère Patridophile, 'Gentil-homme de la Grande-Pologne', 'Gentil-homme polonois' and 'Patridophilis Eleutherus'. He was born in Grzybów and died in Warsaw.

Notes

Sources
Łoyko's manuscripts on Polona.pl

1717 births
1779 deaths
People from Zduńska Wola County
Polish diplomats
18th-century Polish historians
Polish male non-fiction writers
18th-century Polish–Lithuanian writers